The National Centre for Biotechnology Education (NCBE) is a national resource centre at the University of Reading to teach pre-university biotechnology in schools in the UK. It was founded in 1990.

History
It began as the National Centre for School Biotechnology (NCSB) in 1985 in the Department of Microbiology. It became the NCBE in 1990. For many years it was the only centre in Europe that was devoted to the teaching of biotechnology in schools. The Dolan DNA Learning Center had been set up in the USA.

It was set up as an education project by the Society for General Microbiology, now the Microbiology Society. Money from the Laboratory of the Government Chemist set up the National Centre for School Biotechnology (NCSB). Money also came from the Gatsby Charitable Foundation. For the first five years, the UK government's DTI was involved, but from 1990 onwards wanted the organization to become self-supporting as it had to cut back on budgets. By 1992 the government provided no money for the centre.

Structure

The site was set up in former buildings of the University of Reading's Department of Microbiology.

Function
It reaches out to schools to give up-to-date information on biotechnology. Biotechnology is a rapidly evolving subject, and schools cannot keep up-to-date with all that they would be required to know. It produces educational resources. It runs the Microbiology in Schools Advisory Committee (MISAC).

See also
 Centre for Industry Education Collaboration at York
 National Centre for Excellence in the Teaching of Mathematics, University of York
 Science and Plants for Schools, another well-known science resource for UK schools

References

External links
 NCBE
 DNA to Darwin
 Education resources from the University of Leicester
 European Initiative for Biotechnology Education

1985 establishments in the United Kingdom
Biology education in the United Kingdom
Biotechnology in the United Kingdom
Biotechnology organizations
Educational institutions established in 1985
Genetics education
Science education in the United Kingdom
Scientific organizations established in 1985
University of Reading